Zemplín or Zemplén can refer to:
 Zemplín (region), a region in Slovakia
 Zemplín (village), a village in Slovakia
 Zemplén County, a historical county of the Kingdom of Hungary in present Slovakia and Hungary